Alrabiaa Network Television or  ;  also called Al Rabiaa TV is an Iraqi satellite television Network based in Baghdad, Iraq. The channel was launched in 2021 by Ghazwan Jassem.

Programs
 Sout Almalaeb - صوت الملاعب (in Arabic)
 Studio Alateba - ستديو الاطباء (in Arabic)
 Halqa Waswl - حلقة وصل (in Arabic)
 Shako Mako- شكو ماكو (in Arabic)
 Sabah Alrabiaa - صباح الرابعة (in Arabic)

Alrabiaa Network Television acquired the rights to broadcast the matches of the AFC Championships exclusively in all its competitions until 2024, with an estimated amount of 12 million US dollars.

Name of the TV channel
This name represents the fourth authority, and it is a term generally applied to the press and the mass media to highlight their influential role not only in circulating news and knowledge, but also in forming opinion, disclosing information, creating issues and representing the people.

In September 2022, the Network launched more than 16 satellite channels, the most prominent of which are Alrabiaa Movies TV and Alrabiaa Quran TV.

References

External links 
Official Website

Television stations in Iraq
Arab mass media
Arabic-language television stations
Television channels and stations established in 2012
Arab Spring and the media